The 2016 Masters of Formula 3 was the 26th and the final edition Masters of Formula 3 event, a non-championship race for cars that conform to Formula Three regulations. The event was held on 21 August 2016 at Circuit Park Zandvoort, in Zandvoort, North Holland and was the 24th time that the circuit held the event.

Drivers and teams
All teams used Dallara chassis:

Classification

Qualifying

Qualifying Race

Race

References

External links
 Circuit Park Zandvoort website

Masters of Formula Three
Masters
Masters
Masters of Formula Three